Bezas is a municipality located in the province of Teruel, Aragon, Spain. According to the 2004 census (INE), the municipality has a population of 76 inhabitants.

Photo gallery

References

External links
Bezas on Diputación de Teruel

Municipalities in the Province of Teruel